Coleophora sparsipuncta is a moth of the family Coleophoridae. It is found in the United States, including Indiana.

The larvae feed on the leaves of Aster species. They create a trivalved, tubular silken case.

References

sparsipuncta
Moths of North America
Moths described in 1929